Sagar is a village in the Shahapur taluk of Yadgir district in Karnataka state, India. Sagar is ten kilometres south-southwest (SSW) of the town of Shahapur and 6 km from the Shahapur-Bangalore highway. Sagar is specifically known as Dodda Sagar to differentiate it from Halisagar (the village near by Shahapur city)The nearest railhead is in Yadgir.

Demographics 
 census, Sagar had 10,515 inhabitants, with 5,303 males and 5,212 females.

Notes

External links 
 

Villages in Yadgir district